Fannar may refer to:

  Fannar Ólafsson
  Andri Fannar Baldursson
  Sölvi Fannar
  Valur Gíslason (middle name)